NJL may refer to:

 Nordic Journal of Linguistics
 Team NJL Racing
 Nambu–Jona-Lasinio model
 the ISO 639 code for the Nyolge language